Rupert Keegan (born 26 February 1955) is a former racing driver from England. He participated in 37 Formula One World Championship Grands Prix, debuting on 8 May 1977. He scored no championship points.

Keegan won the 1976 British Formula 3 Championship, which propelled him into Formula One.  After seasons with Hesketh and Surtees, neither of them particularly competitive teams, he won the Aurora Formula One Championship in 1979. A return to the Formula One World Championship with RAM driving their Williams FW07B yielded little in the way of results, as did a few races with March.

After Formula One, Keegan raced in the United States in CART, and also in endurance racing.  After his retirement, he pursued business interests and also worked as a racing instructor.

Complete Formula One World Championship results
(key)

External links
GP Encyclopedia
Formula One World

English racing drivers
English Formula One drivers
Hesketh Formula One drivers
Surtees Formula One drivers
RAM Racing Formula One drivers
March Formula One drivers
British Formula One Championship drivers
British Formula Three Championship drivers
People from Westcliff-on-Sea
Indy Lights drivers
1955 births
Living people
24 Hours of Le Mans drivers
World Sportscar Championship drivers